Pain and suffering is the legal term for the physical and emotional stress caused from an injury.

Pain and Suffering may also refer to:
 Pain & Suffering, a 2007 album by American heavy metal band Rhino Bucket
 Azab dan Sengsara, a 1920 Indonesian novel by Merari Siregar
 "Pain and Suffering", a 1982 song from Iggy Pop's album Zombie Birdhouse

See also 
 Pain
 Suffering